"Everybody" is a song co-written and recorded by Australian country music artist Keith Urban. It was released in September 2007 as the fourth and final single from his 2006 album Love, Pain & the Whole Crazy Thing. The song peaked at number 5 on the US Billboard Hot Country Songs charts in early 2008. Urban wrote this song with Richard Marx.

Content
"Everybody" is a mid-tempo ballad that Urban co-wrote with Richard Marx. In it, the male narrator addresses a female who is escaping her relationship ("And the only thing that you've ever known is to run") and tries asking her to stay ("Everybody needs somebody sometimes").

Critical reception
Jordan Levin and Howard Cohen of The Miami Herald called the song "formulaic," and Keith Groller of The Morning Call said that it was "ultra-sappy."

Music video
The music video was directed by Chris Hicky, and premiered on CMT on September 22, 2007.

Personnel
As listed in liner notes.
Keith Urban – lead and backing vocals, lead guitar, acoustic guitar, EBow
Beth Beeson – french horn
Tom Bukovac – rhythm guitar
Eric Darken – percussion
Erin Horner – french horn
Dann Huff – rhythm guitar
Chris McHugh – drums
Tim Lauer – piano, synthesizer
Jimmie Lee Sloas – bass guitar
Joy Worland – french horn

String section
Carl Gorodetzky, Pam Sixfin, Conni Ellisor, Alan Umstead, David Davidson, Cathy Umstead, Cate Myer, Karen Winkelmann, Mary Kathryn Vanosdale, David Angell – violins
Kris Wilkinson, Monisa Angell, Gary Vanosdale – violas
Larry Corbett, Carole Rabinowitz, Anthony LaMarchina – cellos

Chart positions

Year-end charts

Cover versions

Richard Marx version
Richard Marx would later record his own version of the song and release it as the lead single from the European edition of his album Stories To Tell.

References

2007 singles
Keith Urban songs
Richard Marx songs
Songs written by Richard Marx
Song recordings produced by Dann Huff
Songs written by Keith Urban
Capitol Records Nashville singles
Music videos directed by Chris Hicky
2006 songs
Country ballads